Wang Jingang (born March 16, 1991) is a Chinese Paralympic swimmer who represented China in the Paralympic Games.

Career
Jingang represented China in the men's 50 metre butterfly S6 event at the 2020 Summer Paralympics and won a gold medal.

References 

1991 births
Living people
People from Pingdingshan
Chinese male butterfly swimmers
Medalists at the World Para Swimming Championships
Paralympic swimmers of China
Paralympic gold medalists for China
Paralympic bronze medalists for China
Paralympic medalists in swimming
Swimmers at the 2012 Summer Paralympics
Swimmers at the 2016 Summer Paralympics
Swimmers at the 2020 Summer Paralympics
Medalists at the 2012 Summer Paralympics
Medalists at the 2016 Summer Paralympics
Medalists at the 2020 Summer Paralympics
S6-classified Paralympic swimmers
21st-century Chinese people